The Cotton Free Library is the public library serving the town of Weybridge, Vermont.  It is located on Quaker Village Road, in a small architecturally distinguished Colonial Revival building constructed in 1913 donated by Joshua Franklin Cotton.  The building was listed on the National Register of Historic Places in 1996.

Architecture and history
The Cotton Free Library is located in Weybridge's historic village center, just north of Weybridge Town Hall, with which it shares a lot.  It is a small square structure, built out of rock-faced concrete blocks and covered by a hip roof.  Its front facade is symmetrical with the centered entrance sheltered by a gabled portico supported by two Doric columns.  The centered of the gable is adorned with a small oculus window.  The interior's original features include a pressed tin ceiling, a swinging metal arm for holding an oil lamp, and a brass-plated tin chandelier with eight etched-glass globes, originally lit with kerosene but later electrified.  The rear wall has a fireplace whose mantel is adorned with Arts and Crafts tiles.

The library was founded in 1897 by the town after receiving a bequest from Joshua Franklin Cotton, a local citizen.  Originally located in the basement of the town hall, its growing collection prompted the decision to build a dedicated structure.  Land for the building was acquired in 1913, and construction took place in 1914-16, with the building formally opened late in 1916.  The library is one of the only buildings of its type in the state to be built using this type of concrete block.  The building was electrified in 1922.

See also
National Register of Historic Places listings in Addison County, Vermont

References

Libraries on the National Register of Historic Places in Vermont
National Register of Historic Places in Addison County, Vermont
Colonial Revival architecture in Vermont
Library buildings completed in 1913
Buildings and structures in Weybridge, Vermont
Public libraries in Vermont
Libraries established in 1897
1897 establishments in Vermont
1913 establishments in Vermont